This page lists the winners and nominees for the BAFTA Award for Best British Short Film for each year. The British Academy of Film and Television Arts (BAFTA), is a British organisation that hosts annual awards shows for film, television, children's film and television, and interactive media. Since 1960, selected films have been awarded with the BAFTA award for Best Short Film at an annual ceremony.

In the following lists, the titles and names in bold with a dark grey background are the winners and recipients respectively; those not in bold are the nominees. The years given are those in which the films under consideration were released, not the year of the ceremony, which always takes place the following year.

Winners and nominees

1950s
 Best Short Film

1960s

1970s

 John Grierson Award (Short Film)

 Best Short Factual Film

 Best Short Fictional Film

 Best Short Film

1980s

1990s

2000s

2010s

 Best British Short Film

2020s

See also
 Academy Award for Best Animated Short Film
 Academy Award for Best Live Action Short Film

References

British Academy Film Awards
Lists of films by award
Short film awards
BAFTA winners (films)